"Livin' the Dream" is a song written by Tom Douglas, Jaren Johnston and Luke Laird and recorded by American country music artist Drake White. It was released to radio on December 7, 2015 as the second single to his debut studio album, Spark, which was released on August 19, 2016.

Content
The song is about a "lower middle class couple" who are struggling but "focusing on the emotional salve of the healthy, adoring relationship". White told Billboard that "This song does have a realistic point to it that there are bad things going on out there, but at the end of the day, it’s that tough stuff that makes the good stuff good."

The song's arrangement relies mainly on nylon-string guitar playing "a mix of major chords and seventh chords that creates a descending melodic pattern pocked with dissonance and release."

Critical reception
Taste of Country reviewed the song favorably, praising the soulfulness of White's delivery, comparing his vocals favorably to James Otto.

Charts

Weekly charts

Year end charts

References

2015 songs
2015 singles
Drake White songs
Dot Records singles
Songs written by Tom Douglas (songwriter)
Songs written by Jaren Johnston
Songs written by Luke Laird
Song recordings produced by Ross Copperman
Song recordings produced by Jeremy Stover